Magenta is a station of the Île-de-France Réseau Express Régional (RER), in the 10th arrondissement of Paris, France. Built on the site of the Gare du Nord, the original name of Magenta station was Nord-Est with the possibility of a connection to both Paris-Nord and Paris-Est.

Station design
Magenta features a broad, open design with high and airy ceilings, creating a different atmosphere than the Paris Métro. The materials also differ from regular subway stations, with wood and metal contrasting each other. There are nine levels in the station, with the RER using the lower-most basement.

There are four tracks that flank two island platforms. They are numbered as tracks 51, 52, 53, and 54. Track 51 is used for trains to Chelles-Gournay. Track 53 serves Tournan. Tracks 52 and 54 are always used for service to Haussmann–Saint-Lazare.

Adjacent stations
Gare du Nord (RER B and D, underground lines 4 and 5, suburban trains, national and international trains: TGV, Thalys, Eurostar)
Gare de l'Est (underground lines 4, 5 and 7, suburban trains, national and international trains: TGV)
Château-Landon (Paris Métro Line 7)
La Chapelle (Paris Métro Line 2)

Train services
The station is served by the following service(s):

Commuter services from Haussmann–Saint-Lazare to Chelles-Gournay
Commuter services from Haussmann–Saint-Lazare to Tournan

Gallery

See also
 List of stations of the Paris RER
 List of stations of the Paris Métro

External links

 

M
M
M